Aleksey Frosin (born 14 February 1978) is a Russian fencer who won a gold medal in the team sabre competition at the 2000 Summer Olympics in Sydney together with Aleksey Dyachenko, Stanislav Pozdnyakov, and Sergey Sharikov. He won the bronze medal in the individual and team sabre (together with Nikolay Kovalev, Stanislav Pozdnyakov, and Aleksey Yakimenko at the 2006 World Fencing Championships.

References

1978 births
Living people
Russian male fencers
Fencers at the 2000 Summer Olympics
Olympic fencers of Russia
Olympic gold medalists for Russia
Olympic medalists in fencing
Martial artists from Moscow
Medalists at the 2000 Summer Olympics
Universiade medalists in fencing
Universiade bronze medalists for Russia
Russian State University of Physical Education, Sport, Youth and Tourism alumni
Medalists at the 2001 Summer Universiade
Medalists at the 2003 Summer Universiade
Medalists at the 2005 Summer Universiade
21st-century Russian people